Rugby may refer to:

Sport
 Rugby football in many forms:
 Rugby league: 13 players per side
 Masters Rugby League
 Mod league
 Rugby league nines
 Rugby league sevens
 Touch (sport)
 Wheelchair rugby league
 Rugby union: 15 players per side 
 American flag rugby
 Beach rugby
 Mini rugby
 Rugby sevens, 7 players per side
 Rugby tens, 10 players per side
 Snow rugby
 Touch rugby
 Tambo rugby
 Both codes
 Tag rugby
Rugby fives, a handball game, similar to squash, played in an enclosed court
Underwater rugby, an underwater sport  played in a swimming pool and named after rugby football
Rugby ball, a ball for use in rugby football

Arts and entertainment
  Rugby (video game), the 2000 installment of Electronic Arts' Rugby video game series
 Rugby, second movement of Mouvements symphoniques by Arthur Honegger

Brands and enterprises
 Rugby (automobile), made by Durant Motors
 Rugby Cement, a former UK PLC, now a subsidiary of Cemex
 Rugby Ralph Lauren, a brand from fashion designer Ralph Lauren

Places

United Kingdom
 Rugby, Warwickshire, a town
 Rugby (UK Parliament constituency)
 Borough of Rugby

United States
 Rugby, Colorado
 Rugby, Indiana
 Rugby, North Dakota
 Rugby, Virginia
 Rugby, Tennessee
 Rugby Junction, Wisconsin
 Rugby was a former name for Remsen Village, Brooklyn

Elsewhere
 Rugby, New South Wales, Australia
 Rugby Park, Kilmarnock FC's stadium, Scotland

Transportation
 Rugby (automobile), made by Durant Motors
 Rugby station (disambiguation)
 Rugby Street, a street in Bloomsbury, London

Other uses
 Rugby boy, street children in the Philippines
 Rugby School, Rugby, Warwickshire, England
 Baron Rugby, a title in the British peerage
 Rugby Radio Station, a former very low-frequency radio transmission facility in Rugby, Warwickshire, England
 Rugby services, a motorway service station in England